Steven O'Dwyer (born 19 January 1966) is a former Australian rules footballer who played for Melbourne in the VFL/AFL.

A redheaded lanky ruckman, O'Dwyer won the 1988 Keith 'Bluey' Truscott Medal for Melbourne's best and fairest player, helping the club reach their first Grand Final since 1964. However, he missed the decider after being suspended for striking Carlton's Steven Da Rui in the Preliminary Final.

O'Dwyer was traded to Richmond for a draft pick (Darren Kowal) at the end of the 1991 season. Injuries forced O'Dwyer into retirement a year later only managing five games with the Tigers.

Statistics

|- style="background-color: #EAEAEA"
! scope="row" style="text-align:center" | 1987
|
| 32 || 17 || 3 || 4 || 87 || 45 || 132 || 57 || 16 || 239 || 0.2 || 0.2 || 5.1 || 2.6 || 7.8 || 3.4 || 0.9 || 14.1
|-
! scope="row" style="text-align:center" | 1988
|
| 1 || 24 || 16 || 13 || 210 || 80 || 290 || 136 || 25 || 286 || 0.7 || 0.5 || 8.8 || 3.3 || 12.1 || 5.7 || 1.0 || 11.9
|- style="background-color: #EAEAEA"
! scope="row" style="text-align:center" | 1989
|
| 1 || 17 || 6 || 5 || 118 || 47 || 165 || 76 || 9 || 244 || 0.4 || 0.3 || 6.9 || 2.8 || 9.7 || 4.5 || 0.5 || 14.4
|-
! scope="row" style="text-align:center" | 1990
|
| 1 || 15 || 9 || 3 || 89 || 48 || 137 || 48 || 6 || 139 || 0.6 || 0.2 || 5.9 || 3.2 || 9.1 || 3.2 || 0.4 || 9.3
|- style="background-color: #EAEAEA"
! scope="row" style="text-align:center" | 1991
|
| 1 || 11 || 11 || 2 || 59 || 28 || 87 || 45 || 3 || 95 || 1.0 || 0.2 || 5.4 || 2.5 || 7.9 || 4.1 || 0.3 || 8.6
|-
! scope="row" style="text-align:center" | 1992
|
| 1 || 5 || 0 || 1 || 20 || 27 || 47 || 16 || 1 || 41 || 0.0 || 0.2 || 4.0 || 5.4 || 9.4 || 3.2 || 0.2 || 8.2
|- class="sortbottom"
! colspan=3| Career
! 89
! 45
! 28
! 583
! 275
! 858
! 378
! 60
! 1044
! 0.5
! 0.3
! 6.6
! 3.1
! 9.7
! 4.2
! 0.7
! 11.7
|}

References

External links

Demon Wiki profile

1966 births
Living people
Australian rules footballers from Victoria (Australia)
Melbourne Football Club players
Richmond Football Club players
Keith 'Bluey' Truscott Trophy winners